For the 1938 Tour de France, the big cycling nations, Belgium, Italy, Germany and France, each sent a team of 12 cyclists. Other countries, Spain, Luxembourg, Switzerland and the Netherlands, sent smaller teams of six cyclists each. The French had two extra teams of 12 cyclists, the Cadets and Bleuets.

The three most powerful teams were the Belgian, the French and the Italian national team. The Italian team was led by Bartali, who had was close to winning the Tour de France in 1937 until he crashed. The Italian cycling federation had requested him to skip the 1938 Giro d'Italia so he could focus on the Tour de France.

By team

By rider

By nationality

References

1938 Tour de France
1938